The ninth generation (Generation IX) of the Pokémon franchise features 110 fictional species of creatures introduced to the core video game series in the Nintendo Switch games Pokémon Scarlet and Violet. The starter Pokémon were the first Pokémon of the generation to be revealed on 27 February 2022 in the Pokémon Presents presentation.

Design and development 
The first generation IX Pokémon, Sprigatito, Fuecoco, and Quaxly, were announced on 27 February 2022 in the Pokémon Presents that also announced Pokémon Scarlet and Violet.

List of Pokémon

 Sprigatito
 Floragato
 Meowscarada
 Fuecoco
 Crocalor
 Skeledirge
 Quaxly
 Quaxwell
 Quaquaval
 Lechonk
 Oinkologne
 Tarountula
 Spidops
 Nymble
 Lokix
 Pawmi
 Pawmo
 Pawmot
 Tandemaus
 Maushold
 Fidough
 Dachsbun
 Smoliv
 Dolliv
 Arboliva
 Squawkabilly
 Nacli
 Naclstack
 Garganacl
 Charcadet
 Armarouge
 Ceruledge
 Tadbulb
 Bellibolt
 Wattrel
 Kilowattrel
 Maschiff
 Mabosstiff
 Shroodle
 Grafaiai
 Bramblin
 Brambleghast
 Toedscool
 Toedscruel
 Klawf
 Capsakid
 Scovillain
 Rellor
 Rabsca
 Flittle
 Espathra
 Tinkatink
 Tinkatuff
 Tinkaton
 Wiglett
 Wugtrio
 Bombirdier
 Finizen
 Palafin
 Varoom
 Revavroom
 Cyclizar
 Orthworm
 Glimmet
 Glimmora
 Greavard
 Houndstone
 Flamigo
 Cetoddle
 Cetitan
 Veluza
 Dondozo
 Tatsugiri
 Annihilape
 Clodsire
 Farigiraf
 Dudunsparce
 Kingambit
 Great Tusk
 Scream Tail
 Brute Bonnet
 Flutter Mane
 Slither Wing
 Sandy Shocks
 Iron Treads
 Iron Bundle
 Iron Hands
 Iron Jugulis
 Iron Moth
 Iron Thorns
 Frigibax
 Arctibax
 Baxcalibur
 Gimmighoul
 Gholdengo
 Wo-Chien
 Chien-Pao
 Ting-Lu
 Chi-Yu
 Roaring Moon
 Iron Valiant
 Koraidon
 Miraidon
 Walking Wake
 Iron Leaves
 Ogerpon
 Okidogi
 Munkidori
 Fezandipiti
 Terapagos

Paldean Forms

 Tauros
 Wooper

References

External links
 Pokémon Wiki
 Bulbapedia

Lists of Pokémon
Video game characters introduced in 2022